Fort McKinley may refer to:

 Fort William McKinley (Philippine Islands)
 Fort McKinley (Maine)
 Fort McKinley, Ohio